Swansea West is a constituency of the House of Commons of the Parliament of the United Kingdom.  It elects one Member of Parliament (MP) by the first past the post system of election, and is currently represented by Geraint Davies of Labour Co-op, who was first elected in the constituency in 2010.

The Senedd constituency of the same name presently has the same boundaries.

Alan Williams represented the seat for the Labour Party from 1964 until his retirement in 2010; from 2005 until his retirement he was the Father of the House (meaning longest-serving MP currently sitting).

Boundaries

The constituency comprises the electoral wards of 
Sketty, Castle, Killay South, Killay North, Dunvant, Uplands, Townhill, Cockett and Mayals.

1918–1949: The County Borough of Swansea wards of Alexandra, Bryn Melyn, Castle, Ffynone, St Helen's, and Victoria.

1950–1955: The County Borough of Swansea wards of Brynmelyn, Cockett, Ffynone, Oystermouth and Brynau, St Helen's, Sketty, Victoria, and Waunarlwydd.

1955–1983: The County Borough of Swansea wards of Brynmelin, Fforestfach, Ffynone, Mumbles, St Helen's, Sketty, Townhill, and Victoria.

Members of Parliament

Elections

Elections in the 1910s

Elections in the 1920s

Elections in the 1930s

General Election 1939–40:
Another general election was required to take place before the end of 1940. The political parties had been making preparations for an election to take place from 1939 and by the end of this year, the following candidates had been selected; 
 Liberal National: Lewis Jones
 Labour: Percy Morris

Election in the 1940s

Elections in the 1950s

Elections in the 1960s

Elections in the 1970s

Elections in the 1980s

Elections in the 1990s

Elections in the 2000s

Elections in the 2010s

Of the 116 rejected ballots:
33 were either unmarked or it was uncertain who the vote was for.
83 voted for more than one candidate.

1  Geraint Davies is a Labour and Co-operative member but he was nominated as Welsh Labour.

Of the 137 rejected ballots:
117 were either unmarked or it was uncertain who the vote was for.
20 voted for more than one candidate.

See also 
 Swansea West (Senedd constituency)
 List of parliamentary constituencies in West Glamorgan
 List of parliamentary constituencies in Wales

Notes

References

External links
Politics Resources (Election results from 1922 onwards)
Electoral Calculus (Election results from 1955 onwards)
2017 Election House Of Commons Library 2017 Election report
A Vision Of Britain Through Time (Constituency elector numbers)

Parliamentary constituencies in South Wales
Politics of Swansea
Constituencies of the Parliament of the United Kingdom established in 1918